Castrén is the surname of a Finnish family. Notable members include:

 Aarne Castrén (1923–1997), Finnish Olympic sailor
 Arthur Castrén (1866–1946), Finnish politician
 Garth Castrén (born 1939), Finnish diplomat
 Inga-Brita Castrén (1919–2003), Finnish theologian
 Jalmar Castrén (1873–1946), Finnish politician
 Jonas Castrén (1850–1922), Finnish lawyer and politician
 Kaarlo Castrén (1860–1938), Finnish lawyer and politician, briefly Prime Minister of Finland
 Klaus Castrén (1923–2011), Finnish diplomat
 Matthias Castrén (1813–1852), Finnish ethnologist and philologist
 Matilda Castren (born 1995), Finnish professional golfer
 Mauno Castrén (born 1931), Finnish diplomat
 Natalia Castrén (1830–1881), Finnish culture personality and salon hostess
 Urho Castrén (1886–1965), President of the Supreme Administrative Court of Finland, briefly Prime Minister of Finland

Finnish-language surnames
Finnish families